Nadia Jebril (born 1982 in Sweden) whose parents were Palestinian, is a journalist and TV host at the Swedish television (SVT),

References

External links
 Nadia Jebril's blog

1982 births
Living people
Swedish television journalists
Swedish women television presenters
Swedish women journalists
Swedish television hosts
Swedish Muslims
Swedish people of Palestinian descent